A constitutional referendum was held in Morocco on 24 July 1970. The new constitution replaced that approved by referendum in 1962, but suspended by King Hassan II in 1965 (when Parliament was also dissolved) following riots in Casablanca. It was approved by 98.8% of voters, with a 93.2% turnout. Following its approval, fresh elections were held on 21 August.

Results

References

1970 referendums
1970
1970 in Morocco
Constitutional referendums in Morocco